is one of syllable in Javanese script that represent the sound /pɔ/, /pa/. It is transliterated to Latin as "pa", and sometimes in Indonesian orthography as "po".

Pasangan 
Its pasangan form , is one of six pasangan that's located on the right hand side of the previous syllable. Therefore, it is allowed to write two pasangan at the time without having to resort to use pangkon (꧀).

The location of the sandhangan ꦶ, ꦼ, or ꦁ is on top the pasangan, not on the previous syllable. (See glyph table below)

Extended form 

Using cecak telu, the syllable represents /f/.

 with a cerek is called Pa cerek.

Glyphs

Unicode block 

Javanese script was added to the Unicode Standard in October, 2009 with the release of version 5.2.

References 

Javanese script